Batticaloa Gate is monument, which was used as port to connect Puliyanthivu (island) with the mainland of Batticaloa, Sri Lanka. The place believed as landing site of Rev. William Ault, who was the first Methodist missionary to Batticaloa, in 1814. His statue can be seen closer to the Batticaloa Gate. 

Batticaloa Gate and its surrounding areas are under the renovation as part of Batticaloa development project.

References

Buildings and structures in Batticaloa
Gates
Tourist attractions in Eastern Province, Sri Lanka